San Marcos La Laguna is a village on the western shore of Lago Atitlán in the Sololá Department of Guatemala. The village is northwest of three volcanos Volcán San Pedro, Volcán Tolimán, and Volcán Atitlán. The village has an outdoor amphitheater and a few hostels. San Marcos connects to other lakeside communities by boat and a narrow road. The nearest city is Panajachel at the northern side of Lago Atitlán.

It is a small village of 2200 inhabitants; the majority of the population are Kaqchikel-speaking indigenous Mayans.

References

External links

Municipalities of the Sololá Department